Edwin Maysonet (born October 17, 1981) is a former professional baseball infielder. He has played parts of two seasons in Major League Baseball for the Houston Astros in 2008–2009 and part of one season for the Milwaukee Brewers in 2012.

Career
Maysonet was drafted by the Houston Astros in the 19th round of the 2003 Major League Baseball Draft out of Delta State University. He played that season for their Class A (Short Season) Tri-City ValleyCats. In 2004, he played for the Class A Lexington Legends. He split the 2005 season between Lexington and the Class A-Advanced Salem Avalanche. He returned to Salem for the entire 2006 season. He played the entire 2007 season with the Double-A Corpus Christi Hooks. He played the majority of the 2008 season with the Triple-A Round Rock Express, but was called up by the Astros on Sept. 1. He made his major league debut on September 7. Maysonet played 39 games for Houston in 2009 but played the rest of the season with Round Rock. Besides a brief rehab assignment with the Gulf Coast League Astros in 2010, Maysonet played most of his 2010 season with Round Rock.

He was granted free agency after the 2010 season. On December 20, 2010, the Milwaukee Brewers signed him to a minor league deal with an invitation to spring training in 2011.

Maysonet was called up to the Brewers from Triple-A on May 5, 2012.

Maysonet hit a grand slam on May 12, 2012. It was his second career home run and the first grand slam for the Brewers in the 2012 season. It came against the Cubs in the bottom of the sixth inning, giving the Brewers a 6–1 lead.

See also

 List of Major League Baseball players from Puerto Rico

References

External links

1981 births
Living people
Houston Astros players
Milwaukee Brewers players
Major League Baseball infielders
Tri-City ValleyCats players
Lexington Legends players
Salem Avalanche players
Corpus Christi Hooks players
Round Rock Express players
Gulf Coast Astros players
Nashville Sounds players
Somerset Patriots players
People from Arecibo, Puerto Rico
Delta State Statesmen baseball players
Major League Baseball players from Puerto Rico
Iowa Cubs players
Minor league baseball coaches